Shiriana (Xiriâna, Chiriana), or Bahuana (Bahwana), is an unclassified Upper Amazon Arawakan language once spoken by the Shiriana people of Roraima, Brazil. It had an active–stative syntax.

Dialects
Dialects listed by Mason (1950):

Waharibo (Guaharibo)
Shirianá
Waicá (Guaica, Vaica)
Carimé (Karimé)

References

Arawakan languages
Indigenous languages of Western Amazonia
Languages of Brazil
Extinct languages of South America